Yusuf Grillo (1934 – 23 August 2021) was a Nigerian contemporary artist known for his inventive works and the prominence of the color blue in many of his paintings. He was president of the Society of Nigerian Artists.

Life
Yusuf Grillo was born in Lagos and attended Nigerian College of Arts, Science and Technology in Zaria, where he received a diploma in Fine Arts and a post-graduate diploma in education. In 1966, he left Zaria for study at the academic halls of Cambridge University and later traveled to Germany and the United States of America.

Grillo is considered to have been one of Nigeria's outstanding academically trained painters; he emerged to prominence and international recognition in the 1960s and 1970s, while exhibiting a large collection of his early works. He makes use of his western art training in many of his paintings, combining western art techniques with traditional Yoruba sculpture characteristics. His preference for color blue in natural settings paintings, is sometimes similar to the adire or resist-dye textiles used in Nigeria. He was at one time the Head of the Department of Art and Printing at Yaba College of Technology.

Death
He died from complications of COVID-19 on 23 August 2021.

Notable works
1983–1999 - Drummers return currently exhibited at Yemisi Shyllon Museum of Art

References

1934 births
2021 deaths
Artists from Lagos
Yoruba artists
Alumni of the University of Cambridge
Academic staff of Yaba College of Technology
Yoruba academics
Art educators
Deaths from the COVID-19 pandemic in Nigeria